Ichthyenterobacterium is a Gram-negative, aerobic and pleomorphic genus of bacteria from the family of Flavobacteriaceae with one known species (Ichthyenterobacterium magnum). Ichthyenterobacterium magnum has been isolated from the intestine of the fish Paralichthys olivaceus.

References

Flavobacteria
Bacteria genera
Monotypic bacteria genera
Taxa described in 2015